DVG may refer to:
De Vrije Gedachte ("The Free Thought"), a Dutch freethinkers association established in 1856 as De Dageraad ("The Dawn")
D. V. Gundappa, Devanahalli Venkataramanaiah Gundappa, popularly known as DVG, a Kannada writer and philosopher 
Davangere railway station, Railway station code of Davangere, a City in Karnataka, an Indian state
Miscellaneous left, a term referring to left-wing candidates not associated with a major party